Visoka is a village in southern Bulgaria.

Visoka may also refer to:

 Visoka (Arilje), a village in the municipality of Arilje, Serbia
 Visoka (Kuršumlija), a village in the municipality of Kuršumlija, Serbia
 Visoka oil field, an Albanian oil field
 Visoka Mogila,  a village in Boboshevo Municipality, Bulgaria

See also
 Visoka polyana (disambiguation)